The 1860 United States presidential election in Vermont took place on November 2, 1860, as part of the 1860 United States presidential election. Voters chose five electors of the Electoral College, who voted for president and vice president.

Vermont was won by Republican candidate Abraham Lincoln, who won the state by a 56.45% margin. 

With 75.86% of the popular vote, Vermont would be Lincoln's strongest victory in terms of percentage in the popular vote.

Northern Democratic presidential candidate Stephen A. Douglas was born in Brandon, Vermont.

Results

See also
 United States presidential elections in Vermont

References

1860 Vermont elections
1860
Vermont